Warren Park is a town in Warren Township, Marion County, Indiana. The population was 1,480 at the 2010 census. It has existed as an "included town" since 1970, when it was incorporated into Indianapolis as part of Unigov. It is part of Indianapolis, but retains a functioning town government under IC 36-3-1-11.

History
Warren Park was platted in 1913.

Geography
Warren Park is located at  (39.780792, -86.052232).

Demographics

2010 census
As of the census of 2010, there were 1,480 people, 814 households, and 307 families living in the town. The racial makeup of the town was 78.6% White, 16.1% African American, 0.1% Native American, 0.2% Asian, 3.0% from other races, and 1.9% from two or more races. Hispanic or Latino of any race were 7.3% of the population.

There were 814 households, of which 17.2% had children under the age of 18 living with them, 23.0% were married couples living together, 11.3% had a female householder with no husband present, 3.4% had a male householder with no wife present, and 62.3% were non-families. 58.1% of all households were made up of individuals, and 39.5% had someone living alone who was 65 years of age or older. The average household size was 1.82 and the average family size was 2.93.

The median age in the town was 50.5 years. 18.4% of residents were under the age of 18; 5.7% were between the ages of 18 and 24; 18.1% were from 25 to 44; 27.4% were from 45 to 64; and 30.5% were 65 years of age or older. The gender makeup of the town was 41.9% male and 58.1% female.

2000 census
As of the census of 2000, there were 1,656 people, 915 households, and 373 families living in the town. The racial makeup of the town was 92.15% White, 4.47% African American, 0.24% Native American, 0.91% Asian, 0.60% from other races, and 1.63% from two or more races. Hispanic or Latino of any race were 1.45% of the population.

There were 915 households, out of which 16.2% had children under the age of 18 living with them, 28.5% were married couples living together, 9.5% had a female householder with no husband present, and 59.2% were non-families. 56.0% of all households were made up of individuals, and 44.6% had someone living alone who was 65 years of age or older. The average household size was 1.81 and the average family size was 2.77.

In the town, the population was spread out, with 17.9% under the age of 18, 5.4% from 18 to 24, 21.3% from 25 to 44, 18.5% from 45 to 64, and 37.0% who were 65 years of age or older. The median age was 50 years. For every 100 females, there were 67.3 males. For every 100 females age 18 and over, there were 60.8 males.

The median income for a household in the town was $25,185, and the median income for a family was $46,384. Males had a median income of $41,607 versus $25,658 for females. The per capita income for the town was $24,836. About 4.9% of families and 6.2% of the population were below the poverty line, including 1.7% of those under age 18 and 9.6% of those age 65 or over.

References 

Towns in Marion County, Indiana
Towns in Indiana
Indianapolis metropolitan area